Pseudothelphusidae is a family of freshwater crabs found chiefly in mountain streams in the Neotropics. They are believed to have originated in the Greater Antilles and then crossed to Central America via a Pliocene land bridge. Some species of this family are troglobitic in nature and lack pigmentation and also eyes.

Parasitology
Pseudothelpshusids are of significance to humans because many species are secondary hosts for lung flukes of the genus Paragonimus. Predators of pseuthelphusid crabs include the yellow-spotted river turtle and the tufted capuchin.

Taxonomy
Forty genera are recognised:

Allacanthos Smalley, 1964
Achlidon Smalley, 1964
Brasiliothelphusa Magalhães & Türkay, 1986
Camptophallus Smalley, 1965
Chaceus Pretzmann, 1965
Disparithelphusa Smalley & Adkinson, 1984
Ehecatusa Ng & Low, 2010 
Eidocamptophallus Rodríguez & Hobbs, 1989
Elsalvadoria Bott, 1967
Epilobocera Stimpson, 1860
Eudaniela Pretzmann, 1971
Fredius Pretzmann, 1967
Guinotia Pretzmann, 1965
Hypolobocera Ortmann, 1897
Kingsleya Ortmann, 1897
Lindacatalina Pretzmann, 1977
Lobithelphusa Rodríguez, 1982
Martiana Rodríguez, 1980
Microthelphusa Pretzmann, 1968
Moritschus Pretzmann, 1965
Neoepilobocera Capolongo & Pretzmann, 2002
Neopseudothelphusa Pretzmann, 1965
Neostrengeria Pretzmann, 1965
Odontothelphusa Rodríguez, 1982
Oedothelphusa Rodríguez, 1980
Orthothelphusa Rodríguez, 1980
Phallangothelphusa Pretzmann, 1965
Phrygiopilus Smalley, 1970
Potamocarcinus H. Milne-Edwards, 1853
Prionothelphusa Rodríguez, 1980
Pseudothelphusa Saussure, 1857
Ptychophallus Smalley, 1964
Raddaus Pretzmann, 1965
Rodriguezus Campos & Magalhães, 2005
Smalleyus Alvarez, 1989
Spirothelphusa Pretzmann, 1965
Strengeriana Pretzmann, 1971
Tehuana Rodríguez & Smalley, 1969
Typhlopseudothelphusa Rioja, 1952
Villalobosius Ng & Low, 2010

References

 
Crabs
Freshwater crustaceans of South America